Pasaia Kirol Elkartea (also known as Club Deportivo Pasajes) is a Spanish football team based in Pasaia, in the autonomous community of Basque Country. Founded in 1998 it currently plays in the Tercera División RFEF – Group 4, holding home games at Campo de Fútbol Don Bosco, which has a capacity of 2,000 spectators.

Season to season

14 seasons in Tercera División
1 season in Tercera División RFEF

References

External links
Official website 
La Preferente team profile 

Football clubs in the Basque Country (autonomous community)
Sport in Gipuzkoa
Association football clubs established in 1941
1941 establishments in Spain